Samuel Lalmuanpuia (born 27 July 1998) is an Indian professional footballer who plays as an attacking midfielder for I-League club RoundGlass Punjab.

Career
Born in Mizoram, Lalmuanpuia began his career with Shillong Lajong. He represented Lajong's youth side in the Shillong Premier League, where he was top scorer in 2015, and the I-League U19. He made his professional debut for the club on 21 February 2016 against DSK Shivajians. He started the match and played the entire first half as Shillong Lajong were held to a draw, 1–1.

Career statistics

Club

Honours

Kerala Blasters B
Kerala Premier League: 2019–20

References

External links 
 Shillong Lajong Football Club Profile

1998 births
Living people
Indian footballers
Shillong Lajong FC players
Association football midfielders
Footballers from Mizoram
I-League players
Kerala Blasters FC players
RoundGlass Punjab FC players
Indian Super League players
Odisha FC players